Henry Oryem Okello is a Ugandan lawyer and politician. He is the current State Minister for Foreign Affairs (International Affairs). He was appointed to that position in 2004. In the cabinet reshuffles of 1 June 2006, that of 16 February 2009, and that of 27 May 2011, he retained his cabinet post. He has previously served as State Minister for Sports, from 2001 until 2005. He also serves as the elected Member of Parliament for "Chua County", Kitgum District, until 2021.

Background and education
He was born in Chwa County in Kitgum District on 21 January 1960. His late father was General Tito Lutwa Okello (1914–1996), who served as President of Uganda between July 1985 and January 1986.

Oryem Okello holds the degree of Bachelor of Laws with Honors, from the University of Buckingham in the United Kingdom, obtained in 1985. He also holds the degree of Master of Laws, from the University of Southampton, also in the UK, obtained in 1989. He was a practising Barrister-at-Law in Britain, before he left to enter Uganda's politics in 2001.

Career
He practised as a legal executive between 1988 and 2000, in the United Kingdom. In 2001, he was elected to represent Chwa County, Kitgum District, in the Ugandan Parliament, serving continuously in that position until 2006. He was appointed Minister of State for Education and Sports, responsible for sports, serving in that capacity concurrent with his parliamentary responsibilities, until 2005. In 2005 he was appointed to his current ministerial position. Between 2001 and 2005, he served as the Anglophone Vice President, Supreme Council for Sports in Africa.

He did not contest his parliamentary seat during the 2006 elections. However, he still remained a member of parliament, in an ex-offico capacity, on account of being a cabinet minister. Between 2006 and 2008, he served as a member of the government delegation to the Juba peace talks between the Ugandan Government and representatives of the Lord's Resistance Army. On many occasions, he was the Deputy Leader of the Uganda Government Delegation, led by Ambassador Ruhakana Rugunda, at that time the Ugandan Minister of Internal Affairs.

In the 2011 National Elections, Okello Oryem defeated the then MP for "Chua County", Okello Okello, of the Uganda People's Congress political party, to regain his parliamentary seat. He is the current incumbent MP.

Personal details

Henry Oryem Okello is married.

See also
 Parliament of Uganda
 Cabinet of Uganda
 Kitgum District
 List of University of Birmingham people

References

External links

 Full of List of Ugandan Cabinet Ministers May 2011
Website of the Parliament of Uganda
Kitgum District Homepage

1960 births
Living people
People from Kitgum District
20th-century Ugandan lawyers
Members of the Parliament of Uganda
Government ministers of Uganda
Alumni of the University of Southampton
Alumni of the University of Buckingham
People from Northern Region, Uganda
21st-century Ugandan politicians